Moctezuma is the second studio album by Mexican indie rock band Porter. The album's name means "lord of lords" in the Nahuatl language while the songs tell the story of Spaniards arriving to Mexico and the fall of the Aztec Empire and the Mexica people.

This is the band's first album with vocalist David Velasco.

Background and release
Porter's debut studio album, Atemahawke, was released in May 2007. The album received positive reviews and became popular due to the single "Host of a Ghost". The group performed the song at the 2008 Coachella Festival with Natalia Lafourcade. Shortly after the Coachella performance, the band went on hiatus and disbanded as vocalist Juan Son started a solo career while the other members focused on finishing their education. The band announced they would be reforming when the lineup for the 2013 Vive Latino music festival was released. The band reformed with vocalist David Velasco, with Juan Son not performing with the reunited lineup for unknown reasons.

Four music videos were released to promote the album: "Palapa", "Huitzil", "Rincón Yucateco" and "La China". The narrative of the videos center around the lyrics and themes of the album.

Reception
Moctezuma was placed at number 10 on Rolling Stone's 10 Best Latin Albums of 2015.

Track listing

Personnel
Porter
David Velasco – vocals
Victor Valverde – guitar, synthesizer, piano
Fernando de la Huerta – guitar
Diego Rangel – bass, synthesizer
Juan Pablo Vázquez – drums

Additional
Produced by Didi Gutman and Hector Castillo
Artowrk by Christopher Houweling

References

Porter (band) albums
2015 albums
Concept albums